Rocko's Modern Life is an American animated television series created by Joe Murray. It premiered on Nickelodeon on September 18, 1993, and ended on November 24, 1996, with a total of 52 episodes over the course of 4 seasons. A typical, half-hour episode of Rocko's Modern Life featured two twelve-minute stories with a commercial break in between. Occasionally, one story would be told over the half-hour time slot as Part I and Part II.

The Rocko's Modern Life team produced all of the episodes except for one in the San Fernando Valley region of Los Angeles, California, United States. Murray produced the pilot episode, Trash-O-Madness, in his studio in Saratoga, California; Murray animated half of the episode, and the production occurred entirely in the United States, with animation in Saratoga and processing in San Francisco.

On August 11, 2016, Nickelodeon announced that they had greenlit a one-hour special entitled Static Cling, with Murray serving as executive producer. It premiered on Netflix on August 9, 2019.

Series overview

Episodes

Pilot (1992)

Season 1 (1993)

Season 2 (1994–95)

Season 3 (1995–96)

Season 4 (1996)

Static Cling (2019) 
In 2019, Netflix acquired rights to stream a new Rocko special, titled Static Cling.

References

External links
 

Rocko's Modern Life
Rocko
Rocko's Modern Life
Rocko's Modern Life